Skinwalker Ranch, also known as Sherman Ranch, is a property of approximately , located southeast of Ballard, Utah, that is reputed to be the site of paranormal and UFO-related activities. Its name is taken from the skin-walker of Navajo legend concerning vengeful shamans.

Background
UFO reports in the Uintah Basin were publicized in the 1970s. Claims about the ranch first appeared in 1996 in the Salt Lake City, Utah, Deseret News, and later in the alternative weekly Las Vegas Mercury as a series of articles by investigative journalist George Knapp. These early stories detailed the claims of a family that allegedly experienced inexplicable and frightening events after they purchased and occupied the property.

Book
In 2005, Colm Kelleher and co-author George Knapp published a book in which they describe the ranch being acquired by the National Institute for Discovery Science (NIDSci) to study anecdotal sightings of UFOs, bigfoot-like creatures, crop circles, glowing orbs and poltergeist activity reported by its former owners.

Paranormal reputation
The ranch, located in west Uintah County bordering the Uintah and Ouray Indian Reservation, was popularly dubbed the UFO ranch due to its ostensible 50-year history of odd events said to have taken place there. According to Kelleher and Knapp, they saw or investigated evidence of close to 100 incidents that include vanishing and mutilated cattle, sightings of unidentified flying objects or orbs, large animals with piercing red eyes that they say were unscathed when struck by bullets, and invisible objects emitting destructive magnetic fields. Among those involved were retired US Army Colonel John B. Alexander, who characterized the NIDSci effort as an attempt to get hard data using a "standard scientific approach". However, the investigators admitted to "difficulty obtaining evidence consistent with scientific publication".

Cattle mutilations have been part of the folklore of the surrounding area for decades. When NIDSci founder Robert Bigelow purchased the ranch for $200,000, this was reportedly the result of his having been convinced by the stories of mutilations, that included tales of strange lights and unusual impressions made in grass and soil told by the family of former ranch owner Terry Sherman.

Criticism 
According to skeptical author Robert Sheaffer, "the 'phenomenon' at Skinwalker is almost certainly illusory. Not only was the several years long monitoring of 'Skinwalker' by NIDSci unable to obtain proof of anything unusual happening, but also, the people who owned the property prior to the Shermans, a family whose members lived there 60 years, deny that any mysterious 'phenomena' of any kind occurred there". Sheaffer says "the parsimonious explanation is that the supernatural claims about the ranch were made up by the Sherman family prior to selling it to the gullible Bigelow". Sheaffer wrote that many of the more extraordinary claims originated solely from Terry Sherman, who worked as a caretaker after the ranch was sold to Bigelow.

In 1996, skeptic James Randi awarded Bigelow a Pigasus Award for funding the purchase of the ranch and for supporting John E. Mack's and Budd Hopkins' investigations. The award category designated Bigelow as "the funding organization that supported the most useless study of a supernatural, paranormal or occult".

Ownership
 1934 – 1994 – Kenneth and Edith Myers
 1994 – 1996 – Terry and Gwen Sherman
 1996 – 2016 – Robert Bigelow
 2016 – present – Brandon Fugal, via Adamantium Real Estate LLC

In 2016, Bigelow sold Skinwalker Ranch to Adamantium Real Estate LLC. After this purchase, roads leading to the ranch were blocked, the perimeter was guarded by cameras and barbed wire, and signs were posted that aimed to prevent people from approaching the ranch.

Adamantium Real Estate, LLC, a Delaware limited liability company based in Salt Lake City, Utah, filed a U.S. Trademark application for the service mark "Skinwalker Ranch" on February 15, 2017, and was approved and registered on April 14, 2020, with the mark applicable to "providing recreation facilities; entertainment services, namely, creation, development, production, and distribution of multimedia content, internet content, motion pictures, and television shows." An additional trademark filing to expand use on "cups and mugs, shirts and short-sleeved shirts, sports caps and hats" was filed by Adamantium Real Estate, LLC on June 21, 2021, and was approved and registered on July 12, 2022.

In March 2020, Brandon Fugal, 46, Utah real estate tycoon, announced ownership of the ranch.

In popular culture

See also
 List of topics characterized as pseudoscience

Footnotes

References

Further reading
Why a millionaire real-estate mogul bought Skinwalker Ranch 
Brandon Fugal – Supercar owner & Steward of Skinwalker Ranch

External links
Skinwalker Ranch Official Website
SkinwalkerRanch.org – Property maps and updates from local researchers investigating the ranch
RealityUncovered.com Article comparing claimed phenomenon to the region's Native American Ancestral heritage and religious practices (archived) 

17 Creepy Facts About Utah’s ‘Skinwalker Ranch’ at Thought Catalog

Reportedly haunted locations in Utah
Forteana
Utah culture
Conspiracy theories in the United States
Buildings and structures in Uintah County, Utah
Ranches in Utah